"Lazarus Rising" is the fourth season premiere of the CW television series Supernatural. The episode originally aired on September 18, 2008, and was written by series creator Eric Kripke and directed by executive producer Kim Manners.

The episode is set four months after Dean goes to hell in No Rest for the Wicked at the end of season 3.  The narrative follows the brothers Dean (Jensen Ackles) and Sam Winchester (Jared Padalecki) as Dean returns from hell and tries to discover how he came back to life. The episode is perhaps most significant for introducing the angel Castiel (Misha Collins).

Plot 
The episode begins with Dean's (Ackles) painful memory of his time in Hell. He wakes up in a coffin and starts digging himself out. Dean then notices some paranormal traces around his grave. When he walks into a gas station and grabs supplies, he finds out that he has fully recovered from the hellhound attack save for a hand-shaped burn on his left bicep. Before he leaves the store, Dean notices some unusual activities implying supernatural power. Dean tries to call Sam (Padalecki), but his number is no longer connected. He then calls Bobby Singer (Jim Beaver), but Bobby hangs up because he does not believe Dean is still alive. Dean then steals a car and drives to Bobby's. Bobby and Dean take time to make sure that Dean is alive and is still him, and they go to find Sam in a hotel.

At first, Sam also does not believe that Dean is back and tries to attack him. After confirming that Dean is really back, the brothers hug and reunite. However, Sam swears that he did not bring Dean back from Hell and states that he is upset because he "was unable to save Dean".

In order to find out who saved Dean from Hell, Bobby takes Dean and Sam to a psychic friend, Pamela Barnes (Traci Dinwiddie). Barnes senses someone named Castiel, the being who rescued Dean and she tries to reveal his true identity. Castiel warns Pamela that she should stop, but Pamela refuses and keeps trying. She then screams and falls down, and her eyes are burned out.

Later, when Sam and Dean are at a diner, the waitress and two other men reveal themselves as demons that Sam was looking for. They do not harm the brothers, but they seem to know nothing about Dean coming back from Hell. Dean deduces that only something more powerful than a demon, also capable of destroying them, could pull him out of Hell and the demons were too afraid to attack Dean in case they encounter the unknown creature's wrath. The Winchesters decide to leave without killing the demons. However, later that night, Sam comes back to the diner by himself and finds a body with eyes burned out. The waitress - also with eyes burned out - attacks him, but he uses his mind to exorcise the demon inside her, but not before the demon warns him that what caused the devastation is "the end." Then Ruby (Genevieve Cortese) comes into the diner and reveals the fact that she and Sam are trying to improve Sam's power.

Bobby and Dean decide to perform a summoning ritual in a secluded warehouse to find out who saved Dean from Hell, lying about it to Sam. A mysterious man (Misha Collins) appears, walks through all of the traps the two men set up, and is unaffected by their weapons. Identifying himself as Castiel, he knocks Bobby unconscious to talk to Dean alone. Castiel reveals himself to be an Angel of the Lord to a disbelieving Dean, but proves it by showing Dean the shadows of his wings. Castiel explains to the shocked Dean that the noise in the gas station was him trying to communicate with Dean and his true form and voice can be damaging to humans which is why Dean experienced pain and Pamela blindness. Now Castiel has taken on a vessel, a devout man who agreed to possession to communicate with Dean. As Dean remains skeptical of why an angel would rescue him from Hell, Castiel realizes that Dean believes he doesn't deserve to be saved and explains he rescued him as God ordered it and Heaven has work for Dean to do.

Reception 
"Lazarus Rising" was watched by 3.96 million viewers when it originally aired on September 18, 2008, on The CW. These were higher than any episode of the second and third season and the highest rated show since the first season finale.

The episode received critical acclaim. In his list of the top 100 television episodes of 2008, BuddyTV writer John Kubicek ranked "Lazarus Rising" seventh, noting its introduction of angels into the series and its "haunting opening scene". However, his favorite part of "Lazarus Rising" was the opening montage; he explained that, "There is no show on TV that can get a viewer that pumped up for an episode."

In Joseph M. Valenzano III and Erika Engstrom's paper, "Cowboys, Angels, and Demons: American Exceptionalism and the Frontier Myth in the CW's Supernatural", they study how by creating characters like angels and demons, Supernatural celebrates human power and emotions: "Kripke himself reveals that Supernatural relies on a certain pro-American, pro-exceptionalist stance. He also intimates that humanity trumps all supernatural forces, including the more religious entities like God, gods, angels, demons, and the Devil."

References

External links 

Supernatural (season 4) episodes
2008 American television episodes
Television episodes set in South Dakota
Television episodes set in Illinois